Usuard (died 23 January, 875) was a Benedictine monk at the Abbey of Saint-Germain-des-Prés and a Carolingian scholar.

His name appears in a list of monks of Saint-Germain-des-Prés written around 841/847 (a declaration of spiritual association with the monks of the Abbey of Saint-Remi). In 858, he went to Spain with his colleague Odilard monk to collect relics; they returned with those martyrs George, Aurelius and Nathalie, Christians executed in Córdoba, Andalusia on 27 July 852. The account of this voyage, accompanied by miracles, was told by their colleague Aimoin 

Usuard is the author of a martyrology dedicated to Charles the Bald. The dedication seems to only briefly precede the death of the author. The martyrology of Usuard enjoyed consistent success throughout the Middle Ages, as evidenced by numerous surviving manuscripts. This martyrology synthesizes elements of the old Martyrologium Hieronymianum, the martyrology of Ado of Vienne, and an enhanced version of that of Bede, attributed to the archdeacon Florus of Lyon. It contains eleven hundred saints' lives.

Usuard also composed an obituary of the abbey of Saint-Germain-des-Prés, the oldest of its kind (edited by Auguste Molinier, The French obituaries in the Middle Ages, 1890).

Notes

Bibliography 
 Henri Quentin, Les martyrologes historiques du Moyen Âge, Paris, 1908.

External links
Guide to Usuard, Martirologium. Manuscript, 14-- at the University of Chicago Special Collections Research Center

Benedictine monks
Hagiographers
Year of birth unknown
877 deaths